Ludwig Valentich (1884 – April 1961) was an Austrian writer. His work was part of the literature event in the art competition at the 1928 Summer Olympics.

References

1884 births
1961 deaths
20th-century Austrian male writers
Olympic competitors in art competitions
Writers from Vienna